Nilgiri (Sl. No.: 40) is a Vidhan Sabha constituency of Balasore district, Odisha.

Area of this constituency includes Nilagiri, Nilgiri block, Oupada block and 4 GPs (Kasabajayapur, Khantapada, Panapana and Patharpentha) of Bahanaga block.

In 2009 election, Independent candidate Pratap Chandra Sarangi defeated Communist Party of India candidate Pradipta Panda by a margin of 3,056 votes.

Members of Legislative Assembly

16 elections held during 1951 to 2019. Elected members from the Nilgiri constituency are:

Election results

2019 Election Result
In 2019 election, Bharatiya Janata Party candidate Sukanta Kumar Nayak defeated Biju Janata Dal candidate Santosh Khatua by a margin of 1577 votes.

2014 Election Result
In 2014 election, Biju Janata Dal candidate Sukanta Kumar Nayak defeated Bharatiya Janata Party candidate Sushama Biswal by a margin of 13,700 votes.

2009 Election

Notes

References

Assembly constituencies of Odisha
Balasore district